A general election was held in the U.S. state of Delaware on November 3, 2020 concurrently with other nationwide elections, including for President of the United States. Primary elections were held on September 15, 2020.

Federal elections

President

Senate

House of Representatives

State elections

Governor

Lieutenant Governor

Insurance Commissioner

General Assembly

References 

 
Delaware